Place Joachim-du-Bellay is a square near the center of Paris, France, in the 1st arrondissement, near Les Halles and the Pompidou Center. It is named after Joachim du Bellay, a French poet and literary critic (1522–1560).

The place Joachim-du-Bellay was built in 1787 on the location of the previous Holy Innocents' Cemetery, after the cemetery's demolition. The Fountain of Innocents now resides in the center of the square, marking the last still standing remnant of the cemetery.

History of Location 
While the history of the location on which place Joachim-du-Bellay resides is long and rich, this history of the square itself is rather simple. 

The previous structure was that of the Holy Innocents Cemetery, which operated, along with the Church of the Holy Innocents, from the 9th century (Middle Ages) to 1780 AD (during the Ancien Régime in France), when it was closed due to overuse. 

The Holy Innocents Cemetery is notable because it held the first documented mural of Danse Macabre, a style of painting during late-medieval times emphasizing the impact of Death on lives and all ages. This mural was destroyed, however, almost 200 years after its construction, in 1669.

At the edge of the cemetery there was a fountain, originally named Fountain of the Nymphs and now known as Fountain of the Innocents (or Fontaine des Innocents). This fountain was dismantled in 1787 when the grounds of the church and cemetery were finally torn down and replaced by a stone laid square, place Joachim-du-Bellay. The square was originally a herb and vegetable market and was also known as Marché des Innocents.

The Fountain of the Innocents was re-assembled soon after the completion of said square and erected in its center, where it now stands. The Fountain of Innocents is the oldest monumental fountain in Paris.

Sources 

 Fontaine des Innocents

External links
 

Joachim-du-Bellay
Buildings and structures in the 1st arrondissement of Paris